Why Her is a 2022 South Korean television series directed by Park Soo-jin. Starring Seo Hyun-jin in the titular role of Oh Soo-jae, and features Hwang In-youp, Huh Joon-ho in pivotal roles, also Bae In-hyuk appears in the series. It premiered on SBS TV on June 3, 2022, and aired every Friday and Saturday at 22:00 (KST) till July 23.

Synopsis
Oh Soo-jae (Seo Hyun-jin) is a talented lawyer and the youngest partner at TK Law Firm, the best law firm in South Korea. Oh Soo-jae is driven by her desire to win cases and also her self-righteous principles. She has lived her life to achieve success, but she gets involved in an unexpected case and she gets demoted to work as an adjunct professor at Seojung University law school. At the law school, Oh Soo-jae meets Gong Chan (Hwang In-youp). He is a student there. Gong Chan has experienced a painful past, but he still has a warm heart. He falls in love with Oh Soo-jae and he would do anything to protect her. Meanwhile, Choi Tae-kook (Heo Jun-ho) is the chairman of TK Law Firm. He would do anything to satisfy his desires, even if it's illegal or immoral.

Cast and characters

Main
 Seo Hyun-jin as Oh Soo-jae
 A star lawyer who is the youngest partner at TK Law Firm. She has become empty while pursuing only success. She is forced out because of an unexpected incident and demoted to becoming an adjunct professor at a law school.
 Hwang In-youp as Gong Chan / Kim Dong-gu
Lee Eugene as young Gong Chan / Kim Dong-gu
 A twenty-seven year-old law school student who is warm and innocent, but hides a painful past with a twisted fate.
 Huh Joon-ho as Choi Tae-kook
 The chairman of TK Law Firm who crosses the boundaries of good and evil in the face of desire. He has power and hides his inner feelings. He watches over Oh Soo-jae, who is loyal to him.
 Bae In-hyuk as Choi Yoon-sang
 A second year student at Seojung University's law school and the second son of Choi Tae-kook.

Supporting

TK Law Firm 
 Ji Seung-hyun as Choi Joo-wan
 The eldest son and heir of TK Law Firm.
 Lee Joo-woo as Song Mi-rim
 An associate lawyer at TK Law Firm and Legal Clinic Center Guest Attorney.
 Kim Seon-hyuk as Min Young-bae 
Partner Attorney at TK Law Firm
 Jeon Jin-ki as Ha Il-goo 
 TK Law Firm chairman's chief secretary.

Seojung University Law School faculty and students  
 Kim Jae-hwa as Jo Kang-ja
 A first year student at Seojung University Law School and Legal Clinic Center Team Member. She was a former police detective.
 Nam Ji-hyun as Na Se-ryun
 A first year student at Seojung University Law School. Former employee of TK Law Firm's General Affairs Department, Legal Clinic Center Team Member
 Lee Jin-hyuk as Nam Chun-poong
 A cheerful and optimistic law student who is also a former idol trainee.
 Kim Chang-wan as  Baek Jin-gi
 Dean of Seojung University Law School, Kang Eun-seo's father.
 Kim Young-pil as Seo Joon-myeong 
 Professor at Seojung University and The prosecutor became a professor. When he was a prosecutor 10 years ago, he was Kim Dong-goo's prosecutor. But he didn't know Gongchan.
 Ji Joo-yeon as Jeong Hee-yeong
 A law school professor, and Min Young-bae's wife.
 Kim Ji-hwi as Park Jo-Gyo
 Oh Soo-jae's teaching assistant.

Hansoo Group 
 Lee Geung-young as Han Seong-beom
 Chairman of Hansoo Group, the largest customer and sponsor of TK Law Firm.
 Park Shin-woo as Han Dong-oh
 Hansoo Group's managing director.
Jeon Jae-hong as Han Ki-tae
Nephew of Chairman Han Seong-beom, the head of the legal department of Hansoo Group.

People around Oh Soo-jae 
 Lee Jong-nam as Yang Hwa-ja 
Oh Soo-jae's mother.
Nam Jung-woo as Oh Chun-jae 
Oh Soo-jae's older brother.
Lee Seung-bin as Oh Young-jae 
Oh Soo-jae's younger brother

Extended 
 Cha Chung-hwa as Chae Joon-hee
 A professor of family medicine and Oh Soo-jae's only friend.
 Lee Kyu-sung as So Hyeong-chil 
 Gong Chan's roommate and the kitchen attendant in his pub. He was jailed for a year after dreaming of becoming a chef at a luxury hotel, but was caught in a gang brawl.
 Choi Young-joon as Yoon Se-pil
 Representative director of SP Partners, Kang Eun-seo's fiancé. Works with Baek Jin-gi and Oh Soo-jae for Kang Eun-seo and Jeon Na-jeong's justice.
 Bae Hae-sun as Ji Soon-ok
 Gong Chan's stepmother.
 Kim Joong-don as Do Jin-myung
 A homicide detective.
 Seo Jin-won as Kim Sang-man
 Gong Chan's father.
 Jo Dal-hwan as Gu Gu-gap
 Gong Chan's roommate and in-charge of serving in his pub.
 Lee Jin-hee as Seo Jun-myung's Wife
 The wife of a former prosecutor.
 Hwang Ji-ah as Jeon Na-jeong 
Gong-chan's half-sister is warm-hearted with a bright nature and caring attitude. Helped Kang Eun-seo when Kang was sexually assaulted, and was killed for her involvement in the matter.
Jo Young-jin as Lee In-soo 
Together with the Labor Party future presidential candidates.
 Won Hoon-won as Lee Si-hyuk 
Lee In-soo's son Chairman of the Social Welfare Foundation A bank run by skilled craftsmen.
 Hong Ji-yoon as Park So-young 
who claims to be the rape victim of politician Ahn Kang-hoon
 Lee Tae-sung as Ahn Kang-hoon
A future politician who is a presidential candidate and a convicted rapist of Park So-young.
 Park Ji-won as Park Ji-young 
Park So-young's younger sister who demands justice for his sister.
 Kim Yoon-seo as  Im Seung-yeon 
Choi Joon-wan's wife, who goes into flashbacks.
 Ryu Ye-ri as Oh Soo-jung 
 Oh Soo-jae's high school classmate and has a similar name.
 Kim Han-jun as Noh Byeong-chul
 The real villain who raped Jeon Na-jung but was later released later
 Han Joo-hyun as Choi Jae-yi 
 Oh Soo-jae and Choi Joo-wan's daughter.

Special appearance 
 Kwon Sang-woo as Jung Hyeon-soo
 Chae Jun-hee's husband and a good hearted person.
 Han Sun-hwa as  Kang Eun-seo
 Yoon Se-pil's fiancée, Baek Jin-gi's daughter. Past victim of sexual violence and a road accident.

Production

Casting 
On December 10, 2020 SBS announcing its lineup for dramas, informed that a series titled as Why Oh Soo-jae, in which actress Seo Hyun-jin takes on the title role, would be released in 2021. The romance drama  set in a law school, is written by Kim Ji-eun and directed by Park Soo-jin. It was confirmed that she will appear in the series as eccentric professor. Hwang In-youp and Huh Joon-ho were also confirmed as part of the main cast in October 2021.

Filming 
Script reading took place on October 19, 2021 while filming began in November of the same year, and completed on June 14, 2022.

On January 24, 2022 a representative from the entertainment industry told that filming for Why Her who started filming last year, stopped filming for two weeks after director Park Soo-jin was diagnosed with COVID-19. Director Park Soo-jin, who had never been vaccinated on the doctor's recommendation, was unable to return to the filming set for health reasons after being diagnosed with COVID-19.  However, co-director PD Kim Ji-yeon and Kang Bo-seung took over the role of PD Park Soo-jin temporarily. 

On March 14, 2022, it was reported that director Park Soo-jin has returned to direct the drama after three months of convalescing post Covid infection. During his absence the series was co-directed by Kim Ji-yeon and Kang Bo-seung. On April 21, 2022 fresh photos from script reading site were released.

Original soundtrack

Part 1

Part 2

Part 3

Part 4

Part 5

Part 6

Viewership

Accolades

Notes

References

External links
  
 Why Her at Daum 
 Why Her at Naver 
 
 

Seoul Broadcasting System television dramas
Korean-language television shows
South Korean romance television series
South Korean legal television series
Television series by Studio S
2022 South Korean television series debuts
2022 South Korean television series endings
Television productions suspended due to the COVID-19 pandemic